The electromagnetic spectrum is the range of frequencies (the spectrum) of electromagnetic radiation and their respective wavelengths and photon energies.

The electromagnetic spectrum covers electromagnetic waves with frequencies ranging from below one hertz to above 1025 hertz, corresponding to wavelengths from thousands of kilometers down to a fraction of the size of an atomic nucleus.  This frequency range is divided into separate bands, and the electromagnetic waves within each frequency band are called by different names; beginning at the low-frequency (long-wavelength) end of the spectrum these are: radio waves, microwaves, infrared, visible light, ultraviolet, X-rays, and gamma rays at the high-frequency (short wavelength) end.  The electromagnetic waves in each of these bands have different characteristics, such as how they are produced, how they interact with matter, and their practical applications.  There is no known limit for long and short wavelengths. Extreme ultraviolet, soft X-rays, hard X-rays and gamma rays are  classified as ionizing radiation because their photons have enough energy to ionize atoms, causing chemical reactions. Exposure to ionizing radiation can be a health hazard, causing radiation sickness, DNA damage and cancer.  Radiation of visible light and longer wavelengths are classified as nonionizing radiation because they have insufficient energy to cause these effects.

Throughout most of the electromagnetic spectrum, spectroscopy can be used to separate waves of different frequencies, producing a spectrum of the constituent frequencies.  Spectroscopy is used to study the interactions of electromagnetic waves with matter.

History and discovery

Humans have always been aware of visible light and radiant heat but for most of history it was not known that these phenomena were connected or were representatives of a more extensive principle. The ancient Greeks recognized that light traveled in straight lines and studied some of its properties, including reflection and refraction. Light was intensively studied from the beginning of the 17th century leading to the invention of important instruments like the telescope and microscope.  Isaac Newton was the first to use the term spectrum for the range of colours that white light could be split into with a prism.  Starting in 1666, Newton showed that these colours were intrinsic to light and could be recombined into white light.  A debate arose over whether light had a wave nature or a particle nature with René Descartes, Robert Hooke and Christiaan Huygens favouring a wave description and Newton favouring a particle description.  Huygens in particular had a well developed theory from which he was able to derive the laws of reflection and refraction.  Around 1801, Thomas Young measured the wavelength of a light beam with his two-slit experiment thus conclusively demonstrating that light was a wave.

In 1800, William Herschel discovered infrared radiation.  He was studying the temperature of different colours by moving a thermometer through light split by a prism. He noticed that the highest temperature was beyond red. He theorized that this temperature change was due to "calorific rays", a type of light ray that could not be seen.  The next year, Johann Ritter, working at the other end of the spectrum, noticed what he called "chemical rays" (invisible light rays that induced certain chemical reactions). These behaved similarly to visible violet light rays, but were beyond them in the spectrum.  They were later renamed ultraviolet radiation.

The study of electromagnetism began in 1820 when Hans Christian Ørsted discovered that electric currents produce magnetic fields (Oersted's law). Light was first linked to electromagnetism in 1845, when Michael Faraday noticed that the polarization of light traveling through a transparent material responded to a magnetic field (see Faraday effect). During the 1860s, James Clerk Maxwell developed four partial differential equations (Maxwell's equations) for the electromagnetic field. Two of these equations predicted the possibility and behavior of waves in the field. Analyzing the speed of these theoretical waves, Maxwell realized that they must travel at a speed that was about the known speed of light. This startling coincidence in value led Maxwell to make the inference that light itself is a type of electromagnetic wave. Maxwell's equations predicted an infinite range of frequencies of electromagnetic waves, all traveling at the speed of light. This was the first indication of the existence of the entire electromagnetic spectrum.

Maxwell's predicted waves included waves at very low frequencies compared to infrared, which in theory might be created by oscillating charges in an ordinary electrical circuit of a certain type. Attempting to prove Maxwell's equations and detect such low frequency electromagnetic radiation, in 1886, the physicist Heinrich Hertz built an apparatus to generate and detect what are now called radio waves. Hertz found the waves and was able to infer (by measuring their wavelength and multiplying it by their frequency) that they traveled at the speed of light. Hertz also demonstrated that the new radiation could be both reflected and refracted by various dielectric media, in the same manner as light. For example, Hertz was able to focus the waves using a lens made of tree resin. In a later experiment, Hertz similarly produced and measured the properties of microwaves. These new types of waves paved the way for inventions such as the wireless telegraph and the radio.

In 1895, Wilhelm Röntgen noticed a new type of radiation emitted during an experiment with an evacuated tube subjected to a high voltage. He called this radiation "x-rays" and found that they were able to travel through parts of the human body but were reflected or stopped by denser matter such as bones. Before long, many uses were found for this radiography.

The last portion of the electromagnetic spectrum was filled in with the discovery of gamma rays. In 1900, Paul Villard was studying the radioactive emissions of radium when he identified a new type of radiation that he at first thought consisted of particles similar to known alpha and beta particles, but with the power of being far more penetrating than either. However, in 1910, British physicist William Henry Bragg demonstrated that gamma rays are electromagnetic radiation, not particles, and in 1914, Ernest Rutherford (who had named them gamma rays in 1903 when he realized that they were fundamentally different from charged alpha and beta particles) and Edward Andrade measured their wavelengths, and found that gamma rays were similar to X-rays, but with shorter wavelengths.

The wave-particle debate was rekindled in 1901 when Max Planck discovered that light is absorbed only in discrete "quanta", now called photons, implying that light has a particle nature.  This idea was made explicit by Albert Einstein in 1905, but never accepted by Planck and many other contemporaries.  The modern position of science is that electromagnetic radiation has both a wave and a particle nature, the wave-particle duality. The contradictions arising from this position are still being debated by scientists and philosophers.

Range
Wavelength is inversely proportional to the wave frequency, so gamma rays have very short wavelengths that are fractions of the size of atoms, whereas wavelengths on the opposite end of the spectrum can be indefinitely long. Photon energy is directly proportional to the wave frequency, so gamma ray photons have the highest energy (around a billion electron volts), while radio wave photons have very low energy (around a femtoelectronvolt). These relations are illustrated by the following equations:

where:
 c =  is the speed of light in vacuum
 h =  =  is the Planck constant.

Whenever electromagnetic waves travel in a medium with matter, their wavelength is decreased. Wavelengths of electromagnetic radiation, whatever medium they are traveling through, are usually quoted in terms of the vacuum wavelength, although this is not always explicitly stated.

Generally, electromagnetic radiation is classified by wavelength into radio wave, microwave, infrared, visible light, ultraviolet, X-rays and gamma rays. The behavior of EM radiation depends on its wavelength. When EM radiation interacts with single atoms and molecules, its behavior also depends on the amount of energy per quantum (photon) it carries.

Spectroscopy can detect a much wider region of the EM spectrum than the visible wavelength range of 400 nm to 700 nm in a vacuum. A common laboratory spectroscope can detect wavelengths from 2 nm to 2500 nm. Detailed information about the physical properties of objects, gases, or even stars can be obtained from this type of device. Spectroscopes are widely used in astrophysics. For example, many hydrogen atoms emit a radio wave photon that has a wavelength of 21.12 cm. Also, frequencies of 30 Hz and below can be produced by and are important in the study of certain stellar nebulae and frequencies as high as  have been detected from astrophysical sources.

Regions

The types of electromagnetic radiation are broadly classified into the following classes (regions, bands or types):
 Gamma radiation
 X-ray radiation
 Ultraviolet radiation
 Visible light
 Infrared radiation
 Microwave radiation
 Radio waves
This classification goes in the increasing order of wavelength, which is characteristic of the type of radiation.

There are no precisely defined boundaries between the bands of the electromagnetic spectrum; rather they fade into each other like the bands in a rainbow (which is the sub-spectrum of visible light). Radiation of each frequency and wavelength (or in each band) has a mix of properties of the two regions of the spectrum that bound it. For example, red light resembles infrared radiation in that it can excite and add energy to some chemical bonds and indeed must do so to power the chemical mechanisms responsible for photosynthesis and the working of the visual system.

The distinction between X-rays and gamma rays is partly based on sources: the photons generated from nuclear decay or other nuclear and subnuclear/particle process are always termed gamma rays, whereas X-rays are generated by electronic transitions involving highly energetic inner atomic electrons. In general, nuclear transitions are much more energetic than electronic transitions, so gamma rays are more energetic than X-rays, but exceptions exist. By analogy to electronic transitions, muonic atom transitions are also said to produce X-rays, even though their energy may exceed , whereas there are many (77 known to be less than ) low-energy nuclear transitions (e.g., the  nuclear transition of thorium-229m), and, despite being one million-fold less energetic than some muonic X-rays, the emitted photons are still called gamma rays due to their nuclear origin.

The convention that EM radiation that is known to come from the nucleus is always called "gamma ray" radiation is the only convention that is universally respected, however. Many astronomical gamma ray sources (such as gamma ray bursts) are known to be too energetic (in both intensity and wavelength) to be of nuclear origin. Quite often, in high-energy physics and in medical radiotherapy, very high energy EMR (in the > 10 MeV region)—which is of higher energy than any nuclear gamma ray—is not called X-ray or gamma ray, but instead by the generic term of "high-energy photons".

The region of the spectrum where a particular observed electromagnetic radiation falls is reference frame-dependent (due to the Doppler shift for light), so EM radiation that one observer would say is in one region of the spectrum could appear to an observer moving at a substantial fraction of the speed of light with respect to the first to be in another part of the spectrum. For example, consider the cosmic microwave background. It was produced when matter and radiation decoupled, by the de-excitation of hydrogen atoms to the ground state. These photons were from Lyman series transitions, putting them in the ultraviolet (UV) part of the electromagnetic spectrum. Now this radiation has undergone enough cosmological red shift to put it into the microwave region of the spectrum for observers moving slowly (compared to the speed of light) with respect to the cosmos.

Rationale for names
Electromagnetic radiation interacts with matter in different ways across the spectrum. These types of interaction are so different that historically different names have been applied to different parts of the spectrum, as though these were different types of radiation. Thus, although these "different kinds" of electromagnetic radiation form a quantitatively continuous spectrum of frequencies and wavelengths, the spectrum remains divided for practical reasons arising from these qualitative interaction differences.

Types of radiation

Radio waves

Radio waves are emitted and received by antennas, which consist of conductors such as metal rod resonators.  In artificial generation of radio waves, an electronic device called a transmitter generates an AC electric current which is applied to an antenna.  The oscillating electrons in the antenna generate oscillating electric and magnetic fields that radiate away from the antenna as radio waves.  In reception of radio waves, the oscillating electric and magnetic fields of a radio wave couple to the electrons in an antenna, pushing them back and forth, creating oscillating currents which are applied to a radio receiver.  Earth's atmosphere is mainly transparent to radio waves, except for layers of charged particles in the ionosphere which can reflect certain frequencies.

Radio waves are extremely widely used to transmit information across distances in radio communication systems such as radio broadcasting, television, two way radios,  mobile phones, communication satellites, and wireless networking.  In a radio communication system, a radio frequency current is modulated with an information-bearing signal in a transmitter by varying either the amplitude, frequency or phase, and applied to an antenna.  The radio waves carry the information across space to a receiver, where they are received by an antenna and the information extracted by demodulation in the receiver.     Radio waves are also used for navigation in systems like Global Positioning System (GPS) and navigational beacons, and locating distant objects in radiolocation and radar.  They are also used for remote control, and for industrial heating.

The use of the radio spectrum is strictly regulated by governments, coordinated by the International Telecommunication Union (ITU) which allocates frequencies to different users for different uses.

Microwaves

Microwaves are radio waves of short wavelength, from about 10 centimeters to one millimeter, in the SHF and EHF frequency bands.   Microwave energy is produced with klystron and magnetron tubes, and with solid state devices such as Gunn and IMPATT diodes.  Although they are emitted and absorbed by short antennas, they are also absorbed by polar molecules, coupling to vibrational and rotational modes, resulting in bulk heating.  Unlike higher frequency waves such as infrared and light which are absorbed mainly at surfaces, microwaves can penetrate into materials and deposit their energy below the surface.   This effect is used to heat food in microwave ovens, and for industrial heating and medical diathermy.    Microwaves are the main wavelengths used in radar, and are used for satellite communication, and wireless networking technologies such as Wi-Fi. The copper cables (transmission lines) which are used to carry lower-frequency radio waves to antennas have excessive power losses at microwave frequencies, and metal pipes called waveguides are used to carry them.  Although at the low end of the band the atmosphere is mainly transparent, at the upper end of the band absorption of microwaves by atmospheric gases limits practical propagation distances to a few kilometers.

Terahertz radiation or sub-millimeter radiation is a region of the spectrum from about 100 GHz to 30 terahertz (THz) between microwaves and far infrared which can be regarded as belonging to either band. Until recently, the range was rarely studied and few sources existed for microwave energy in the so-called terahertz gap, but applications such as imaging and communications are now appearing. Scientists are also looking to apply terahertz technology in the armed forces, where high-frequency waves might be directed at enemy troops to incapacitate their electronic equipment.  Terahertz radiation is strongly absorbed by atmospheric gases, making this frequency range useless for long-distance communication.

Infrared radiation

The infrared part of the electromagnetic spectrum covers the range from roughly 300 GHz to 400 THz (1 mm – 750 nm). It can be divided into three parts:
 Far-infrared, from 300 GHz to 30 THz (1 mm – 10 μm). The lower part of this range may also be called microwaves or terahertz waves. This radiation is typically absorbed by so-called rotational modes in gas-phase molecules, by molecular motions in liquids, and by phonons in solids. The water in Earth's atmosphere absorbs so strongly in this range that it renders the atmosphere in effect opaque. However, there are certain wavelength ranges ("windows") within the opaque range that allow partial transmission, and can be used for astronomy. The wavelength range from approximately 200 μm up to a few mm is often referred to as Submillimetre astronomy, reserving far infrared for wavelengths below 200 μm.
 Mid-infrared, from 30 to 120 THz (10–2.5 μm). Hot objects (black-body radiators) can radiate strongly in this range, and human skin at normal body temperature radiates strongly at the lower end of this region. This radiation is absorbed by molecular vibrations, where the different atoms in a molecule vibrate around their equilibrium positions. This range is sometimes called the fingerprint region, since the mid-infrared absorption spectrum of a compound is very specific for that compound.
 Near-infrared, from 120 to 400 THz (2,500–750 nm). Physical processes that are relevant for this range are similar to those for visible light. The highest frequencies in this region can be detected directly by some types of photographic film, and by many types of solid state image sensors for infrared photography and videography.

Visible light

Above infrared in frequency comes visible light. The Sun emits its peak power in the visible region, although integrating the entire emission power spectrum through all wavelengths shows that the Sun emits slightly more infrared than visible light. By definition, visible light is the part of the EM spectrum the human eye is the most sensitive to. Visible light (and near-infrared light) is typically absorbed and emitted by electrons in molecules and atoms that move from one energy level to another. This action allows the chemical mechanisms that underlie human vision and plant photosynthesis. The light that excites the human visual system is a very small portion of the electromagnetic spectrum. A rainbow shows the optical (visible) part of the electromagnetic spectrum; infrared (if it could be seen) would be located just beyond the red side of the rainbow whilst ultraviolet would appear just beyond the opposite violet end.

Electromagnetic radiation with a wavelength between 380 nm and 760 nm (400–790 terahertz) is detected by the human eye and perceived as visible light. Other wavelengths, especially near infrared (longer than 760 nm) and ultraviolet (shorter than 380 nm) are also sometimes referred to as light, especially when the visibility to humans is not relevant. White light is a combination of lights of different wavelengths in the visible spectrum. Passing white light through a prism splits it up into the several colours of light observed in the visible spectrum between 400 nm and 780 nm.

If radiation having a frequency in the visible region of the EM spectrum reflects off an object, say, a bowl of fruit, and then strikes the eyes, this results in visual perception of the scene. The brain's visual system processes the multitude of reflected frequencies into different shades and hues, and through this insufficiently-understood psychophysical phenomenon, most people perceive a bowl of fruit.

At most wavelengths, however, the information carried by electromagnetic radiation is not directly detected by human senses. Natural sources produce EM radiation across the spectrum, and technology can also manipulate a broad range of wavelengths. Optical fiber transmits light that, although not necessarily in the visible part of the spectrum (it is usually infrared), can carry information. The modulation is similar to that used with radio waves.

Ultraviolet radiation

Next in frequency comes ultraviolet (UV). The wavelength of UV rays is shorter than the violet end of the visible spectrum but longer than the X-ray.

UV is the longest wavelength radiation whose photons are energetic enough to ionize atoms, separating electrons from them, and thus causing chemical reactions.  Short wavelength UV and the shorter wavelength radiation above it (X-rays and gamma rays) are called ionizing radiation, and exposure to them can damage living tissue, making them a health hazard.  UV can also cause many substances to glow with visible light; this is called fluorescence.

At the middle range of UV, UV rays cannot ionize but can break chemical bonds, making molecules unusually reactive. Sunburn, for example, is caused by the disruptive effects of middle range UV radiation on skin cells, which is the main cause of skin cancer. UV rays in the middle range can irreparably damage the complex DNA molecules in the cells producing thymine dimers making it a very potent mutagen.

The Sun emits UV radiation (about 10% of its total power), including extremely short wavelength UV that could potentially destroy most life on land (ocean water would provide some protection for life there). However, most of the Sun's damaging UV wavelengths are absorbed by the atmosphere before they reach the surface. The higher energy (shortest wavelength) ranges of UV (called "vacuum UV") are absorbed by nitrogen and, at longer wavelengths, by simple diatomic oxygen in the air. Most of the UV in the mid-range of energy is blocked by the ozone layer, which absorbs strongly in the important 200–315 nm range, the lower energy part of which is too long for ordinary dioxygen in air to absorb. This leaves less than 3% of sunlight at sea level in UV, with all of this remainder at the lower energies. The remainder is UV-A, along with some UV-B. The very lowest energy range of UV between 315 nm and visible light (called UV-A) is not blocked well by the atmosphere, but does not cause sunburn and does less biological damage. However, it is not harmless and does create oxygen radicals, mutations and skin damage.

X-rays

After UV come X-rays, which, like the upper ranges of UV are also ionizing. However, due to their higher energies, X-rays can also interact with matter by means of the Compton effect. Hard X-rays have shorter wavelengths than soft X-rays and as they can pass through many substances with little absorption, they can be used to 'see through' objects with 'thicknesses' less than that equivalent to a few meters of water. One notable use is diagnostic X-ray imaging in medicine (a process known as radiography). X-rays are useful as probes in high-energy physics. In astronomy, the accretion disks around neutron stars and black holes emit X-rays, enabling studies of these phenomena. X-rays are also emitted by stellar corona and are strongly emitted by some types of nebulae. However, X-ray telescopes must be placed outside the Earth's atmosphere to see astronomical X-rays, since the great depth of the atmosphere of Earth is opaque to X-rays (with areal density of 1000 g/cm2), equivalent to 10 meters thickness of water. This is an amount sufficient to block almost all astronomical X-rays (and also astronomical gamma rays—see below).

Gamma rays

After hard X-rays come gamma rays, which were discovered by Paul Ulrich Villard in 1900. These are the most energetic photons, having no defined lower limit to their wavelength. In astronomy they are valuable for studying high-energy objects or regions, however as with X-rays this can only be done with telescopes outside the Earth's atmosphere. Gamma rays are used experimentally by physicists for their penetrating ability and are produced by a number of  radioisotopes. They are used for irradiation of foods and seeds for sterilization, and in medicine they are occasionally used in radiation cancer therapy. More commonly, gamma rays are used for diagnostic imaging in nuclear medicine, an example being PET scans. The wavelength of gamma rays can be measured with high accuracy through the effects of Compton scattering.

See also

Notes and references

External links

 Australian Radiofrequency Spectrum Allocations Chart (from Australian Communications and Media Authority)
 Canadian Table of Frequency Allocations  (from Industry Canada)
 U.S. Frequency Allocation Chart – Covering the range 3 kHz to 300 GHz (from Department of Commerce)
 UK frequency allocation table (from Ofcom, which inherited the Radiocommunications Agency's duties, pdf format)
 Flash EM Spectrum Presentation / Tool – Very complete and customizable.
 Poster "Electromagnetic Radiation Spectrum" (992 kB)

 
Waves